Tofla (also spelled Toafla) is an Ivory Coast village in the central sub-prefecture of Iriéfla, Zuénoula Department, Marahoué Region, Sassandra-Marahoué District. It was a commune until March 2012, when it and 1125 others nationwide were abolished.

Notes

Former communes of Ivory Coast
Populated places in Sassandra-Marahoué District
Populated places in Marahoué